General Motors is an innovator of automatic transmissions, introducing the Hydra-Matic in 1940. This list includes some GM transmissions.

Automatic transmissions

Early models
The GM Hydra-Matic was a success and installed in the majority of GM models by 1950.  Through the 1950s, all makers were working on their own automatic transmission, with four more developed inside GM alone.  All of GM's early automatic transmissions were replaced by variants of the Turbo-Hydramatic by the 1970s.
1940–1967 Hydra-Matic — Oldsmobile (now the trade name for all GM automatic transmissions)
1948–1963 Dynaflow — Buick
1950–1973 Powerglide — Chevrolet (also used by Pontiac, Holden, Vauxhall and Opel)
1968-1971 Torquedrive- Chevrolet ( Camaro and Chevy II, Nova. Manually shifted on Column. )
1957–1961 Turboglide — Chevrolet (V8 models only, except Corvette)
1958–1959 Flightpitch — Buick
1961–1963 Dual Path Turbine Drive — Buick
1961–1964 Roto Hydramatic — Oldsmobile/Pontiac (also used by Holden, Vauxhall and Opel)
1964–1969 Super Turbine 300 — Buick/Oldsmobile/Pontiac (Oldsmobile Jetaway)
1968–1969 Torquedrive — Chevrolet (manually column shifted 2 speed automatic, 6 cyl only)
1956-1964 4 speed Controlled coupling HydraMatic, also known as Cadillac 315 or P 315 HydraMatic, Oldsmobile Jetaway, Pontiac Super HydraMatic.
 TempestTorque, ( Pontiac) a two speed based on Powerglide, but having the added feature of " Split Torque " dividing the engine power between mechanical connection and the torque converter in high gear.

Turbo-Hydramatic
The Turbo-Hydramatic was used by all GM divisions, and formed the basis for the company's modern Hydramatic line.  The basic rear-wheel drive Turbo-Hydramatic spawned two front-wheel drive variants, the transverse Turbo-Hydramatic 125, and the longitudinal Turbo-Hydramatic 425.  A third variant was the light-duty rear wheel drive Turbo-Hydramatic 180 used in many European models.  In Argentina, the Turbo Hydra-Matic was available on some models of the 1969-1978 Chevrolet "Chevy," essentially the 1968 U.S. Nova, but was marketed as the "Chevromatic."
Heavy-duty rear wheel drive
1971–1994 3L80HD (heavy duty version of TH400)
Medium-duty rear wheel drive
1964–1992 Super Turbine 400/TH400/3L80
1969–1986 TH350/TH350C/TH375B/TH250/TH250C
1972–1976 TH375 — Light duty version of TH400
1976–1987 TH200/TH200C
1981–1990 TH200-4R
1982–1993 TH700R4/4L60
Light-duty rear wheel drive
1969–1998 TH180/TH180C/3L30 — 3-speed European/Asian model. Also manufactured and used by Holden as the Trimatic transmission.
Transverse front wheel drive
1980–1999 TH125/TH125C/3T40 — 3-speed light-duty
1984–1994 TH440-T4/4T60 — 4-speed medium-duty
Longitudinal front wheel drive
1966–1978 TH425 — 3-speed
1979–1981 TH325 — 3-speed
1982–1985 TH325-4L — 4-speed

Electronic Hydra-Matics
The next-generation transmissions, introduced in the early 1990s, were the electronic Hydra-Matics based on the Turbo-Hydramatic design.  Most early electronic transmissions use the "-E" designator to differentiate them from their non-electronic cousins, but this has been dropped on transmissions with no mechanical version like the new GM 6L80 transmission.

Today, GM uses a simple naming scheme for their transmissions, with the "Hydra-Matic" name used on most automatics across all divisions.

First-generation longitudinal (Rear Wheel drive)
1991–2001 4L30-E — 4-speed light-duty (used in BMW, Cadillac, Isuzu, and Opel cars)
1992– 4L60-E/4L65-E — 4-speed medium-duty (used in GM trucks and rear-wheel-drive cars)
1991– 4L80-E/4L85-E — 4-speed heavy-duty (used in GM trucks)
First-generation transverse (Front Wheel drive)
1995–2010 4T40-E/4T45-E — 4-speed light-duty (used in smaller front wheel drive GM vehicles)
1991–2010 4T60-E/4T65-E/4T65E-HD — 4-speed medium-duty (used in larger front wheel drive GM vehicles)
1993–2010 4T80-E — 4-speed heavy-duty (used in large front wheel drive GM vehicles, only with Cadillac NorthStar V8 and Related Oldsmobile V8)
Second-generation longitudinal (Rear Wheel drive)
2000–2007 5L40-E/5L50 — 5-speed medium-duty (used in Cadillac's Sigma vehicles)
2007–present 6L45/6L50 — 6-speed medium-duty (used in GM Sigma platform cars)
2006–present: 6L80/6L90 — 6-speed heavy-duty (used in GM trucks and performance cars)
2014–present: 8L90 — 8-speed heavy-duty (used in GM trucks and performance cars)
2016–present: 8L45 — 8-speed light-duty (used in GM luxury cars)
2017–present: 10L80* - Ford-GM 10-speed automatic transmission (used in GM light trucks including pickups and related SUVs) 
2017–present: 10L90* - Ford-GM 10-speed automatic transmission (used in GM performance cars) 
*This transmission is part of a joint-venture between General Motors and Ford Motor Company to split development of two transmissions, a longitudinal 10-speed and transverse 9-speed. Ford led the design of the 10-speed transmission, as well as filing the design patents for said transmission. According to an official report by the SAE (Society of Automotive Engineers) the design of the 10-speed gearbox is essentially all Ford, while GM was responsible for designing the 9-speed 9T transverse automatic gearbox. As part of their joint-venture, Ford will let GM use the 10-speed transmission with rights to modify and manufacture it for their own applications. In-exchange for Ford's 10-speed transmission, General Motors will let Ford use its 9-speed transmission for front-wheel drive applications; Ford ultimately declined use of the 9T and instead, removed 1 gear and used the 9T as an 8-speed transmission.

Second-generation transverse (Front Wheel drive)
2008–present: 6T30/6T40/6T45 — 6-speed light-duty
2006–present: 6T70/6T75 — 6-speed medium-duty
2016–present: 9T50/9T65 Hydra-Matic – 9-speed

Hybrid and PHEV
2ML70 - 2-Mode Hybrid transmission.
4ET50 (MKA) - Electric Drive Unit Transaxle (First Generation Chevrolet Volt / Cadillac ELR)
5ET50 (MKV) - Electronically controlled, continuously variable automatic transaxle (Second Generation Chevrolet Volt)
5ET50 (MKE) - Electronically controlled, continuously variable automatic transaxle Transaxle (Full Hybrid, Ninth Generation Chevrolet Malibu)
4EL70 (MRD) - Electric Drive Unit Transmission (PHEV Cadillac CT6)

Other automatics
Aisin AF33 — 5-speed transverse automatic made by Aisin AW Co., Ltd.
Allison 1000 Series — 6-speed longitudinal automatic made by Allison Transmission
Saturn MP6/MP7 — 4-speed automatic developed by Saturn for use in the S-series from 1991 to 2002
VTi transmission — continuously variable transmission
Tremec M1L transmission — 8-speed Dual-Clutch made by Tremec for the Chevrolet Corvette C8
GM  VT40/CVT-250 (RPO MRD) Introduced in 2019 — continuously variable transmission

Future

Manual transmissions

Longitudinal transmissions
Aisin AR5/MA5 — 5-speed longitudinal manual made by Aisin
Aisin AY6 — 6-speed longitudinal manual made by Aisin
Getrag 260 — 5-speed longitudinal manual made by Getrag
Muncie M20 — 4-speed longitudinal wide ratio manual transmission made by GM at their Muncie, Indiana factory
Muncie M21 — 4-speed longitudinal close ratio manual transmission made by GM at their Muncie, Indiana factory
Muncie M22 — 4-speed longitudinal heavy duty close ratio manual transmission made by GM at their Muncie, Indiana factory
Saginaw M26/27 transmission — 3 and 4-speed longitudinal light duty (less than 300 hp) wide ratio manual transmission made by GM at their Saginaw, Michigan factory
Muncie M62/M64 — 3-speed longitudinal transmission made by GM
Muncie SM420 transmission — 4-speed manual used up to 1967, very similar to sm 465 except small changes to gear ratios and location of reverse. 
New Process Gear NP435 - 4-speed longitudinal transmission used in a select handful of 67-72 GM pickups
New Process Gear A833 RPO MY6 or MM7 — 4-speed longitudinal A833 overdrive transmission made by New Process Gear for early to mid 1980s General Motors Light Trucks
Muncie SM465 — 4-speed longitudinal manual used in 68- 91 Chevy 1/2 3/4 and 1 ton trucks
New Venture Gear NV1500 — 5-speed longitudinal manual made by New Venture Gear
New Venture Gear 3500/4500 — 5-speed longitudinal manual made by New Venture Gear
Borg-Warner T-10 transmission — 4-speed longitudinal manual currently made by Richmond Gear; originally made by Borg-Warner
Tremec T-5 — 5-speed longitudinal manual currently made by Tremec; originally made by Borg-Warner
Borg-Warner R-10 overdrive - 3-speed manual transmission with electric overdrive used 1937-1964
Borg-Warner R-11 overdrive - 3-speed manual transmission with electric overdrive Ford used them up until 1975 in trucks.
Borg-Warner T-50 transmission — 5-speed longitudinal manual - used by GM in its RWD H-Body cars and a few other limited light duty applications from 1976 to 1978;
Tremec T-56 — 6-speed longitudinal manual overdrive made by Tremec; formerly made by Borg-Warner
Tremec TR-6060 — 6-speed longitudinal manual overdrive made by Tremec
ZF S6-650 — 6-speed longitudinal manual made by ZF Friedrichshafen
Tremec TR-6070 — 7-speed longitudinal manual overdrive made by Tremec

Transverse Transmissions
F23 — 5-speed transverse manual manufactured by Getrag
M17 — 4-speed transverse manual manufactured by Muncie
F35 — 5-speed transverse manual manufactured by Saab in Gothenburg, Sweden
F40 — 6-speed transverse manual manufactured by FGP Germany
Getrag 282 — 5-speed transverse manual designed by Getrag and manufactured by Muncie Getrag
Getrag 284 — 5-speed transverse manual designed by Getrag and manufactured by Muncie Getrag
MP2/MP3 — 5-speed manual developed by Saturn for use in the S-Series from 1991 to 2002

See also
List of ZF transmissions

References

Opel
GM transmissions